Marceau Van Hoorebecke (1900-1957) was a French composer and conductor of film scores.

Selected filmography
 William Tell (1934)
 Ramuntcho (1938)
 Vidocq (1939)
 Sacred Woods (1939)
 Three from St Cyr (1939)
 The Secret of Madame Clapain (1943)
 The Wolf of the Malveneurs (1943)
 Blondine (1945)
 Sergil and the Dictator (1948)
 Forbidden to the Public (1949)
 The Martyr of Bougival (1949)
 The Passenger (1949)
 Oriental Port (1950)
 Captain Ardant (1951)
 Sergil Amongst the Girls (1952)
 The Red Head (1952)
 Domenica (1952)
 My Childish Father (1953)

References

Bibliography
 Soister, John T. Conrad Veidt on Screen: A Comprehensive Illustrated Filmography. McFarland, 2002.

External links

1900 births
1957 deaths
French composers
Musicians from Lille